Dorval station may refer to:
 Dorval station (Exo), an intermodal commuter rail and bus station
 Dorval station (Via Rail), an inter-city train station